From the Press Box to Press Row is a nationally syndicated sports talk radio show which places major emphasis on college sports at historically black colleges and universities (HBCU). The show airs for one hour weekly on stations across the country. The show can also be listened to online.  Donal Ware currently hosts the show.

The show premiered on August 20, 2005, as a live call-in show on seven stations around the country. From the Press Box to Press Row was featured in JET Magazine after celebrating five years on the air on August 20, 2010. It celebrated its 100th show on September 15, 2007, and its 200th on August 29, 2009.

On December 2, 2011, From the Press Box to Press Row premiered on SiriusXM Radio Channel 141. It airs each Friday from 1-2 pm ET and replays Tuesdays from 8-9 am ET.  Boxtorow Lunch with Donal Ware, as it is also known, talks HBCU and pro sports, and adds an entertainment element with some of the top entertainers in the business appearing as guests, talking sports.

The show also began airing on SiriusXm Channel 142 on November 16, 2013 and airs each Saturday from 12-1 pm ET.

The show's guests have included top HBCU coaches, student-athletes and administrators, as well as Serena Williams, Kevin Durant, Michael Vick, Demarcus Ware, Matt Kemp, Jim Brown, Tony Dungy, Gabrielle Douglas, Frank Robinson, the late Buck O'Neil, Stephen A. Smith, William Rhoden, Jason Whitlock, Avery Johnson, Candace Parker, Jerry Rice, Mike Krzyzewski, Kellen Winslow, Michael Strahan, Bill Lester, Sam Jones, Earl "The Pearl" Monroe, Al Attles, Earl Lloyd, and Ken Williams. The show has stepped outside of sports and has had such guests as Snoop Lion, Common, Scarface, Rakim, Ice Cube, Eve, Melanie Fiona, Aretha Franklin, Faith Evans, and Gladys Knight, Joss Stone, Lisaraye, Meagan Good, Lauren London, Anthony Anderson, and Smokie Norful. 

From the Press Box to Press Row has broadcast live from world-renowned events such as Radio Row at Super Bowls XLI, XLIII and XLIII.  The show was also credentialed to cover Super Bowl XLIII in Tampa. From the Press Box to Press Row has broadcast live from NBA All-Star Weekend in Las Vegas and New Orleans, NBA Finals, the 2009, 2011, and 2013 MLB All-star game in 2009 and live from the CIAA Tournament.

Other entities that are direct derivatives of the show include its official website www.boxtorow.com;  Boxtorow Blitz, a weekly three-minute feature encompassing actual play-by-play audio of some of the big HBCU games during the week and audio of big plays made by HBCU alumni who are playing in the NFL; the Boxtorow Beauties; Football Fantasies Calendar Series; the Boxtorow HBCU Football Weekly Top 10 Polls (media and coaches); From the Press Box to Press Rows Top 10 FCS HBCU Recruiting Classes; and "From the Press Box to Press Row: This History Makes Past, Present and Future".

From the Press Box to Press Row is owned and operated by DWCommunications, LLC. It is syndicated by, and is a presentation of, the DWCommunications Radio Networks.  It is one of a handful of shows that airs on terrestrial and satellite radio.

References

External links
 

American sports radio programs